FPV may refer to:

Sports 
 Peruvian Volleyball Federation
 Portuguese Volleyball Federation
 Puerto Rican Volleyball Federation
 Valencian Pilota Federation
 FK Pobeda Valandovo, a football club from Valandovo, Republic of Macedonia
 FK Prelegentai Vilnius, a Lithuanian football team

Other uses 
 Feline panleukopenia virus
 First-person view (radio control), a method of piloting radio-controlled devices
 Ford Performance Vehicles, an Australian vehicle manufacturer
 Front for Victory, a political party and alliance in Argentina
 Voltaic Progressive Front, a political party in Upper Volta
 Fishery Protection Vessel, of the Scottish Fisheries Protection Agency